Northern Sami Braille is the braille alphabet of the Northern Sami language. It was developed in the 1980s based on the Scandinavian Braille alphabet but with the addition of seven new letters (á, č, đ, ŋ, š, ŧ, ž) required for writing in Northern Sámi.

Chart
Northern Sami Braille uses  (French à) for á, dot 6 is added to c and d for  č and  đ, while the other accented letters are the mirror-images in braille of the base form in print. 

{| class="wikitable" style="line-height: 1.2"
|- align=center
|  a
|  á
|  b
|  c
|  č
|  d
|  đ
|  e
|  f
|  g
|- align=center
|  h
|  i
|  j
|  k
|  l
|  m
|  n
|  ŋ
|  o
|  p
|- align=center
|  r
|  s
|  š
|  t
|  ŧ
|  u
|  v
|  z
|  ž
|   
|}

Punctuation is the same as in Norwegian Braille.

References

French-ordered braille alphabets
Northern Sámi